Next, stylized as neXt, is German producer André "ATB" Tanneberger's tenth studio album, released on April 21, 2017, by Kontor Records.

Description
It features two CDs, released in digipak format in Europe, where it was also released as a deluxe limited edition box set, that comes with a scarf, which reads ATB Family; as a limited 2-LP edition; and as a limited edition, which comes in PVC sleeve, and presentes the first disc in vinyl format and the second one in CD.

The artist announced the release of the album on February 10, 2017, on his Facebook page, stating:
"Hey ATB family. Finally the wait is over. I’m really happy to announce that my new album “neXt” will be out on April 21st 2017!!!
Pre-order my album on CD and vinyl on amazon now! 
Online version will follow :) Wishing you guys a great weekend.
Andre :)"

Track listing

Charts

References

2017 albums
ATB albums